Aurélie Adam Soule or Aurélie Adam Soule Zoumarou (born 1984) is a Beninese politician who serves as Minister of Digital Economy and Communications in the Cabinet of Benin.

Life
Soule was born in Nikki in 1984. She has a technology based master's degree from Telecom SudParis and a Certificate in Management of Public Policies and Leadership from Syracuse University in New York.

She worked in France and returned to Benin in 2008.

She was appointed the Minister of Digital Economy and Communications for Benin. in October 2017 by President Patrice Talon.

She was elected to chair the ministers of French-speaking nations who are working together to improve their medium and long terms plans for the digital economy in 2019. Soule encouraged further digitisation supported by UNCTAD in Benin. Laws had been written to regulate the e-economy byt they had not been passed. Soule noted that the coronavirus pandemic in 2020 provided an opportunity for further e-commerce.

References

Women government ministers of Benin
1984 births
Living people
21st-century Beninese women politicians
21st-century Beninese politicians